Elisabeth P. Montgomery is a teacher, author, and film producer. Her work focuses on social entrepreneurship, community economic development planning, and women's empowerment in China, the United States, and Latin America.

Education 
As an educator in China, she serves as the Senior Advisor on Internationalization for the Nanshan District Education Bureau, and Foreign Vice Principal at the South China University of Science and Technology Education Group. Montgomery served as the Headmaster of Shenzhen YuCai High School International Department from 2012 to 2017. The school was a model Great Books academy that used Shared Inquiry methodology for critical thinking in Chinese public schools.   In collaboration with the Nanshan Education Bureau, she opened the Nanshan Great Books Teacher Training Center in 2014 to train educators the Shared Inquiry method and co-founded The Dragon & Eagle Dialogues, a district-wide annual program since 2010. The program in Nanshan was awarded the first district prize in Shenzhen to internationalize schools to meet 21st-century goals. As a senior advisor, Montgomery developed career and Green STEAM programs in Chinese public schools, focusing on teacher training, students, and parents from grades 1 through 12. In 2021, Montgomery won the Outstanding Educator of Career Professionals Award presented by the Asia Pacific Career Development Association.

Social Entrepreneurship 
Before her work in China, during the 1970s, Montgomery worked for ten years at the Jane Addams Hull-House in Chicago, Illinois, as a Director of Youth Employment and later as Social Entrepreneurship Director at the center's youth services division. With grants from the MacArthur Foundation, Montgomery created non-profit companies to support local businesses that were about to close and led to thousands of jobs for residents that are still open to this day. In 1986, she produced her first feature documentary called Jane Addams and the Women of Hull House for WTTW. The feature film, starring actress Ellyn Burstyn, developed the historical facts about American frontiers in social democracy, the struggles for children and women's rights, labor relations, immigrant rights, and education. 

Complementing her work in Chicago, Montgomery worked in Bogota, Colombia on cross-cultural Economic Development projects at the Fundacion Social in conjunction with Pontifical Xavierian University. She produced documentaries for university-run Cenpro Television.  One film featured the story of Padre Campoamor, a Spanish Jesuit priest who arrived in Bogota in 1911 and started schools for orphaned children. His orphans became teachers, accountants, and leaders in Bogota's Circulo de Obreros. Following that film, she documented the survivors of one Colombia's volcanic explosion that wiped out the mountain city of Armero.

Montgomery's early work in community economic development planning led her to San Francisco Bay Area in the 1990s.  There she worked at Hospitality House in the Tenderloin Community of San Francisco and served as the Enterprise Director, promoting city-wide adult and youth employment programs for the homeless, especially jobs in literature and arts.

In 1999, Dr. Montgomery and architect husband Dr. Eugene Tsui, and family moved to Shenzhen, China. There, she worked for Shenzhen Manager's Training College and Shenzhen University as a cross-cultural trainer. In 2007, she founded InterLangua Software, a global language management firm that brings cross-cultural education to schools in China, the United States, and South America.

Film
 Jane Addams and the Women of Hull House for WTTW, 1986. Role: Producer. 
 Nuestro Modo de Ser (Our Way of Being) documented the lives of a community of elderly women that were once orphaned girls in Colombia, South America. It aired on Cenpro Television production on April 26, 1987. Role: Producer. 
 Armero, Night of Ashes documented the survivors of the volcanic explosion that wiped out the mountain city of Armero while working with the United Nations, 1987. Role: Producer.  
 Presente for the Challenge of Literacy, a feature documentary advocating adult bilingual education and supported by the Illinois Secretary of State, 1988. Role: Producer. 
 Rites of Passage, a feature documentary about youth offenders in the Woodlawn community documenting the lives, families, schools, and youth workers, 1988. Role: Producer. 
 Employed by the Education Bureau in China, Dr. Montgomery produced a number of documentaries (2010–2017) as part of her InterLangua series. Role: Producer. 
 ruth weiss, the beat goddess a feature documentary about the Beat Generation's ruth weiss, 2019. Role: Producer.

Works and publications
 Thirty Years of China's Economic Reform: Institutions, Management Organizations and Foreign Investment: Contemporary Entrepreneurs in South China: a Discussion of Their Individual Values, Nova, 2010.
 Fire in the Lake : Chinese Urban Micro-Business Owner-Manager Values and Perspectives on International Development, 2019.

References

Year of birth missing (living people)
Living people